A company, abbreviated as co., is a legal entity representing an association of people, whether natural, legal or a mixture of both, with a specific objective. Company members share a common purpose and unite to achieve specific, declared goals. Companies take various forms, such as:
 voluntary associations, which may include nonprofit organizations
 business entities, whose aim is generating profit
 financial entities and banks
 programs or educational institutions

A company can be created as a legal person so that the company itself has limited liability as members perform or fail to discharge their duty according to the publicly declared incorporation, or published policy. When a company closes, it may need to be liquidated to avoid further legal obligations.

Companies may associate and collectively register themselves as new companies; the resulting entities are often known as corporate groups.

Meanings and definitions
A company can be defined as an "artificial person", invisible, intangible, created by or under law, with a discrete legal personality, perpetual succession, and a common seal. Except for some senior positions, companies remain unaffected by the death, insanity, or insolvency of an individual member.

Etymology
The English word, company, has its origins in the Old French term  (first recorded in 1150), meaning a "society, friendship, intimacy; body of soldiers", which came from the Late Latin word  ("one who eats bread with you"), first attested in the Salic law ( AD 500) as a calque of the Germanic expression  (literally, "with bread"), related to Old High German  ("companion") and to Gothic  ("messmate").

Semantics and usage 
By 1303, the word company referred to trade guilds. Usage of the term company to mean "business association" was first recorded in 1553,
and the abbreviation "co." dates from 1769.

Companies around the world

China
In China, companies are often government run or government supported. Other companies may be foreign companies or export-based corporations. However, many of these companies are government regulated.

United Kingdom

In English law and in legal jurisdictions based upon it, a company is a body corporate or corporation company registered under the Companies Acts or under similar legislation. Common forms include:
 Private companies limited by guarantee
 Community interest company
 Charitable incorporated organisation
 Private companies limited by shares - the most common form of company
 Public limited companies - companies, usually large, which are permitted to (but do not have to) offer their shares to the public, for example on a stock exchange

In the United Kingdom, a partnership is not legally a company, but may sometimes be referred to (informally) as a "company". It may be referred to as a "firm".

United States

In the United States, a company is not necessarily a corporation. For example, a company may be a "corporation, partnership, association, joint-stock company,  trust,  fund, or organized group of persons, whether incorporated or not, and (in an official capacity) any receiver, trustee in bankruptcy, or similar official, or liquidating agent, for any of the foregoing".

Types

 A company limited by guarantee (CLG):  Commonly used where companies are formed for non-commercial purposes, such as clubs or charities. The members guarantee the payment of certain (usually nominal) amounts if the company goes into insolvent liquidation, but otherwise, they have no economic rights in relation to the company. This type of company is common in England. A company limited by guarantee may be with or without having share capital.
 A company limited by shares: The most common form of the company used for business ventures. Specifically, a limited company is a "company in which the liability of each shareholder is limited to the amount individually invested" with corporations being "the most common example of a limited company". This type of company is common in England and many English-speaking countries. A company limited by shares may be a publicly traded company or a privately held company.
 A company limited by guarantee with a share capital:  A hybrid entity, usually used where the company is formed for non-commercial purposes, but the activities of the company are partly funded by investors who expect a return. This type of company may no longer be formed in the UK, although provisions still exist in law for them to exist.
 A limited liability company: "A company—statutorily authorized in certain states—that is characterized by limited liability, management by members or managers, and limitations on ownership transfer", i.e., L.L.C. LLC structure has been called "hybrid" in that it "combines the characteristics of a corporation and of a partnership or sole proprietorship". Like a corporation, it has limited liability for members of the company, and like a partnership it has "flow-through taxation to the members" and must be "dissolved upon the death or bankruptcy of a member".
 An unlimited company with or without a share capital: A hybrid entity, a company where the liability of members or shareholders for the debts (if any) of the company are not limited. In this case, the doctrine of a veil of incorporation does not apply.

Less common types of companies are:

 Companies formed by letters patent: Most corporations by letters patent are corporations sole and not companies as the term is commonly understood today.
 Royal charter corporations: In middle-ages Europe, before the passing of modern companies legislation, these were the only types of companies. Now they are relatively rare, except for very old companies that still survive (particularly many British banks), or modern societies that fulfill a quasi-regulatory function (for example, the Bank of England is a corporation formed by a modern charter).
 Statutory companies: Relatively rare today, certain companies have been formed by a private statute passed in the relevant jurisdiction.

When "Ltd" is placed after the company's name, it signifies a limited company, and "PLC" (public limited company) indicates that its shares are widely held.

In the legal context, the owners of a company are normally referred to as the "members". In a company limited or unlimited by shares (formed or incorporated with a share capital), this will be the shareholders. In a company limited by guarantee, this will be the guarantors. Some offshore jurisdictions have created special forms of offshore company in a bid to attract business for their jurisdictions. Examples include segregated portfolio companies and restricted purpose companies.

However, there are many sub-categories of company types that can be formed in various jurisdictions in the world.

Companies are also sometimes distinguished for legal and regulatory purposes between public companies and private companies. Public companies are companies whose shares can be publicly traded, often (although not always) on a stock exchange which imposes listing requirements/Listing Rules as to the issued shares, the trading of shares and future issue of shares to help bolster the reputation of the exchange or particular market of an exchange. Private companies do not have publicly traded shares, and often contain restrictions on transfers of shares. In some jurisdictions, private companies have maximum numbers of shareholders.

A parent company is a company that owns enough voting stock in another firm to control management and operations by influencing or electing its board of directors; the second company being deemed a subsidiary of the parent company. The definition of a parent company differs by jurisdiction, with the definition normally being defined by way of laws dealing with companies in that jurisdiction.

See also

 Corporate personhood
 List of company registers
 List of largest employers
 Lists of companies
 Stewardship
 Types of business entity

References

Further reading
 Alan Dignam and John Lowry. Company Law. Oxford: Oxford University Press, 2020. .
 John Micklethwait and Adrian Wooldridge, The Company: A Short History of a Revolutionary Idea. New York: Modern Library, 2003.

External links

 
 

Legal entities
 
Corporations